Marco Apicella (born 7 October 1965 near Bologna) is an Italian professional racing driver. He competed in one Formula One Grand Prix for the Jordan team in the 1993 Italian Grand Prix. He later won the 1994 Japanese Formula 3000 Championship driving for Dome.

Career 
Marco Apicella was born in Bologna on 7 October 1965. He began competing in Formula Three racing in 1984, and took victory for Scuderia Coloni in the first two rounds of the 1986 Italian Formula Three season. Apicella competed in the 1985 Macau Grand Prix, where he failed to finish.

International Formula 3000 (1987–1991) 
Apicella's first season in International Formula 3000, 1987, was uncompetitive in the EuroVenturini Dallara car, only scoring one point thanks to a fifth place at the Spa-Francorchamps circuit. During the same year, he tested the Minardi Formula One car at the Autódromo do Estoril circuit. Apicella moved to the FIRST team for the 1988 season and was a title favourite for the season. He bought the March Engineering car to a second-place finish in the Monza race, but was not as competitive as teammate Pierluigi Martini. The team underperformed, but in 1989, again with FIRST (who had made a change to Reynard Motorsport cars), Apicella achieved several podium finishes on his way to finishing fourth overall in the Drivers' Championship. Apicella looked like a championship contender for the 1990 season and continued with the FIRST team, but his performances worsened as the season progressed, ending with a disqualification in the Brands Hatch round. A crash at the Pau Grand Prix prevented him from claiming his first win. Despite a poor 1990 season, Apicella had the chance to test drive with the Modena and Minardi teams. Late in the year, he went to Japan and did some tests for Bridgestone in a Reynard-Mugen Formula One prototype car. Apicella chose to change teams for the 1991 season, moving to Paul Stewart Racing, teaming up with Stewart himself. He was classified fifth overall at the end of the season. Apicella was able to score podiums, but not victories, in the Lola car. Apicella started more International F3000 races than any other winless driver.

Japanese Formula 3000 (1992–1993) 
With no offers for a drive in International F3000 for 1992, Apicella went to Japan to drive in the Japanese Formula 3000 series, setting up a relationship with the Dome team. Apicella came tenth in the standings, the best of any Dome driver. Apicella, driving the Dome F103 won the fifth round of the championship that year. He continued to improve, finishing fourth in the 1993 season, winning at the Sugo race circuit.

Formula One 
Apicella's good performances in Japan during 1992 and early 1993 gave him a drive at the Jordan Formula One team for his home race in the 1993 season, with team boss Eddie Jordan wanting to try out up-and-coming Formula 3000 drivers. He replaced Thierry Boutsen. Apicella tested the Jordan 193 car at Imola before the race weekend. During practice for the race he spun on the moist tarmac at the second Lesmo corner. He qualified in 23rd position, half a second behind teammate Barrichello, who set his times later in the session after the circuit had become less damp. It was the first time Apicella had driven a racing car with a semi-automatic gearbox. Apicella retired at the first corner of the first lap of the race after a multi-car collision. He was replaced by Emanuele Naspetti for the following round in Portugal. As a result of this, he is falsely considered to have had the shortest Formula 1 career out of any driver, a record held by Ernst Loof. Apicella retired after driving 800 metres, while Loof's car broke down as it was pulling away from the starting grid.

Japanese Formula 3000/Formula Nippon (1994–1996) 
For 1994, Apicella continued with Dome in Japanese Formula 3000, winning at the Mine, Suzuka and Fuji circuits on his way to winning the title. He continued in Japanese F3000 for 1995 and 1996 (the series being renamed Formula Nippon for 1996), this time with Team 5Zigen, but his activities were limited, as he chose to do other motor sport activities such as the 24 Hours of Le Mans.

Apicella was appointed Chief Test Driver with Dome for 1996, testing the Dome F105 car alongside Shinji Nakano and Katsumi Yamamoto from April to June 1996 at the Suzuka Circuit. The aim was for the car to produce a base for them to mount a challenge into Formula One, but the project was shelved after the car was substantially damaged in an accident.

Apicella's last season in the Formula Nippon series was in 1997, driving for the Stellar International team. His best result for the team was a fourth place at the Mine circuit.

Other series (1999–present) 
Apicella moved back to Italy for 1999, competing in the Italian Formula 3000 championship. He scored two wins during the season on his way to third place in the championship. Apicella also tried to qualify for the Spa round of the International Formula 3000 championship in 1999 for Monaco Motorsport, but failed to do so due to adverse weather conditions. Apicella has since gone back to Japan, to compete in touring cars with the All Japan GT Championship.

Apicella has also competed in several 24 Hours of Le Mans races. He was scheduled to compete in the 2007 event with the JLOC Isao Noritake team, but on the first day of practice he was involved in an accident on the Mulsanne Straight, which heavily damaged his Lamborghini Murciélago car. Apicella competed in the 2009 event, again with the JLOC team. This and a start for JLOC in the 2009 Super GT Series saw the end of Apicella's professional racing career.

Racing record

Complete International Formula 3000 results
(key) (Races in bold indicate pole position; races in italics indicate fastest lap.)

Complete Japanese Formula 3000/Formula Nippon results
(key) (Races in bold indicate pole position; races in italics indicate fastest lap)

† Did not finish, but was classified as he had completed more than 90% of the race distance.

Complete Formula One results
(key)

24 Hours of Le Mans results

References

External links 
 

1965 births
Living people
Sportspeople from Bologna
Italian racing drivers
Italian Formula One drivers
Japanese Formula 3000 Championship drivers
Jordan Formula One drivers
24 Hours of Le Mans drivers
Formula Nippon drivers
Auto GP drivers
Super GT drivers
International Formula 3000 drivers
European Le Mans Series drivers
Paul Stewart Racing drivers
Team LeMans drivers
Italian expatriate sportspeople in Japan
Scuderia Coloni drivers
TOM'S drivers